The Vendée is a  river in the Nouvelle-Aquitaine and Pays de la Loire regions in western France. It a right tributary of the Sèvre Niortaise.

Its source is near L'Absie, in the west of the Deux-Sèvres department. For a few kilometres, it forms the border between the departments of Vendée (named after the river) and Charente-Maritime, before it flows into the Sèvre Niortaise, near Marans.

The name is attested as Fluvium Vendre in the 10th century, and as Flumen Vendee and Vendeia by the 11th century. According to Pierre-Henri Billy, the name ultimately derives from the Celtic toponym *vindo- meaning white or brilliant in a sacred context (as in the Modern Welsh gwyn/wyn). The name likely originates in Proto-Celtic or Gaulish, but may also have originated in the Gallo or Old Breton languages.

It flows through the following departments and towns:

Deux-Sèvres: Saint-Paul-en-Gâtine 
Vendée: Mervent, Fontenay-le-Comte, Velluire, L'Île-d'Elle
Charente-Maritime

References

Rivers of France
Rivers of Nouvelle-Aquitaine
Rivers of Pays de la Loire
Rivers of Deux-Sèvres
Rivers of Vendée
Rivers of Charente-Maritime